Buffalo Creek is a northern suburb of the city of Darwin, Northern Territory, Australia.

History
Buffalo Creek is an undeveloped northern suburb of Darwin. The name is taken from the stream of the same name which first appears on maps in the 1940s by the Army.

References
 

Suburbs of Darwin, Northern Territory
History of the Northern Territory